Walter Kenneth Wesbrook (June 6, 1898, Detroit, Michigan – January 22, 1991, Los Angeles, California) was an American tennis player and coach.

In 1923, he reached the doubles final at the U.S. Clay Court championship with John Hennessey before falling to brothers Howard and Robert Kinsey of San Francisco, 6–4, 13–11, 6–3. Later that year, he won the Western Lawn Tennis Association championship over George Lott, 6–1, 9–7, 7–5.

Wesbrook played and coached collegiate Tennis at the University of Michigan. As a player, he won the Big Ten singles titles in 1919 and 1920, and the Big Ten doubles title with Nicholas Bartz in 1919. He also competed in the pole vault and long jump for the Michigan Wolveriens track team. He could pole vault 12 feet and long jump 23 feet. By 1921, he was the tennis coach at Michigan, and went 8–3 in his one season there.

At the Cincinnati Masters tournament, Wesbrook reached the singles and doubles finals in 1920. He lost the singles title in four tough sets to Hennessey, and, with partner Kenneth Simmons, he lost the doubles final to the team of Hennessey and Fritz Bastian in five sets: 3–6, 4–6, 6–2, 7–5, 2–6.

After his playing career, Wesbrook moved to California and became a teacher and tennis coach at the Polytechnic School in Pasadena, California. He also competed in the Senior Olympics and holds numerous national track and field records for the 75–79 and 80–84 age groups. He was also the Tennis Professional at the famous Huntington Hotel in Pasadena.

External links
 University of Michigan Men's Tennis History page
 TIME magazine article on 1923 Clay Court championships, July 23, 1923
 TIME article on 1923 Western Lawn Tennis Association championships
 Big Ten tennis champions, 1910-2004 (PDF file)
 Senior Olympics records for people over 70
 Oak Tree Times (Polytechnic School newsletter) reference

1898 births
1991 deaths
American male tennis players
American tennis coaches
Schoolteachers from California
Senior Olympic competitors
Michigan Wolverines men's tennis players
Sportspeople from Detroit
Sportspeople from Pasadena, California
Tennis people from Michigan
Professional tennis players before the Open Era
Michigan Wolverines men's tennis coaches
20th-century American educators